Zita Lemo is a former Austrian international table tennis player.

She won a bronze medal in the Corbillon Cup (women's team event) at the 1938 World Table Tennis Championships. The team only consisted of herself and Gertrude Pritzi with the non playing captain being Robert Thum.

See also
 List of table tennis players
 List of World Table Tennis Championships medalists

References

Austrian female table tennis players
Living people
World Table Tennis Championships medalists
Year of birth missing (living people)